Jeremy Lloyd Lawlor (born 4 November 1995) is a Welsh cricketer who played for Glamorgan County Cricket Club and Cardiff MCC University. He holds an Irish passport and plays for the Northern Knights

He is a right-handed batsman who also bowls right-arm medium fast. He made his first-class debut for Cardiff MCC University against Glamorgan in April 2015. He made his List A debut on 25 April 2019, for Glamorgan in the 2019 Royal London One-Day Cup. He made his T20 debut on 18 July 2019, for Glamorgan against Somerset, in the 2019 t20 Blast.

In February 2021, Lawlor was named in the Ireland Wolves' squad for their tour to Bangladesh. In July 2021, Lawlor was added to Ireland's One Day International (ODI) squad for their series against South Africa.

References

External links
 
 

1995 births
Living people
Welsh cricketers
Irish cricketers
Cardiff MCCU cricketers
Wales National County cricketers
Glamorgan cricketers
Munster Reds cricketers
Northern Knights cricketers
People educated at Monmouth School for Boys